Quasimitra variabilis, common name: the variable mitre, is a species of sea snail, a marine gastropod mollusk in the family Mitridae, the miters or miter snails.

Description 
The shell size varies between 20 mm and 46 mm.

Distribution 
This species occurs in the Indian Ocean off Madagascar and in the Pacific Ocean off Australia.

References 

 Dautzenberg, Ph. (1929). Mollusques testacés marins de Madagascar. Faune des Colonies Francaises, Tome III

External links 
 Reeve L.A. (1844–1845). Monograph of the genus Mitra. In: Conchologia Iconica, vol. 2, pl. 1–39 and unpaginated text. L. Reeve & Co., London. [stated dates: pl. 1–7, August 1844; pl. 8–15, September 1844; pl. 16–19, October 1844; pl. 20–23, November 1844; pl. 24–27, December 1844; pl. 28–29, January 1845; pl. 30 imprinted March 1844, presumably March 1845; pl. 31–39, March 1845]  
 Gastropods.com: Mitra (Mitra) variabilis; accessed: 11 December 2010
 omlin J.R. le B. (1920). On certain of Link's names in the Mitridae. The Nautilus. 33: 133–134
 Fedosov A., Puillandre N., Herrmann M., Kantor Yu., Oliverio M., Dgebuadze P., Modica M.V. & Bouchet P. (2018). The collapse of Mitra: molecular systematics and morphology of the Mitridae (Gastropoda: Neogastropoda). Zoological Journal of the Linnean Society. 183(2): 253–337

variabilis
Gastropods described in 1844